Suvorove is a village located in Bakhchysarai Raion, Crimea. Population:

See also
Bakhchysarai Raion

References

Villages in Crimea
Bakhchysarai Raion